Werner Trzmiel is a German Olympic hurdler. He represented his country at the 1964 and 1968 Summer Olympics.

References 

1942 births
Olympic athletes of the United Team of Germany
Olympic athletes of West Germany
German male hurdlers
Athletes (track and field) at the 1964 Summer Olympics
Athletes (track and field) at the 1968 Summer Olympics
Living people
People from Castrop-Rauxel
Sportspeople from Münster (region)